Ballymacward is a village in County Galway, Ireland, on the R359 regional road between the main road and rail networks which traverse east-west, 24 kilometres from Ballinasloe and approximately 48 kilometres from Galway City. It was once part of the kingdom of the Soghain of Connacht.

It lies 4 km north of Woodlawn railway station. This station opened in 1858 and was closed for goods traffic in 1978. It is on the main Iarnród Éireann Intercity line from Dublin to Galway, situated between Ballinasloe and Attymon halt stations.

See also
List of towns and villages in Ireland

References

External links

Landed Estates Database - Woodlawn House
Abandoned Ireland - Woodlawn House

Towns and villages in County Galway